Antal I. "Tony" Jákli (born 3 October 1958) is a Hungarian-American physicist and professor of Chemical Physics at Kent State University. He is known for his work with bent-core, flexoelectric, and ferroelectric liquid crystals.

Education and career
Jákli received a Master of Science in 1983 and later a Ph.D. in 1986 in Physics from Eötvös Loránd University in Budapest, Hungary. After postdoctoral fellowships with Alfred Saupe at Kent State University from 1989 to 1992 and at the Max Planck Institute in Halle, Germany, from 1993 to 1995, he became a research fellow at the Research Institute for Solid State Physics in Budapest. He was later awarded a D.Sc. from the Hungarian Academy of Sciences in 2000.

He moved to the United States in 1999 to join the Liquid Crystal Institute at Kent State University as a research fellow. He became an assistant professor there in 2004, receiving tenure in 2007 and a promotion to full professorship in 2012.

Research
His current research interests include studies of bent-core and other liquid crystals with reduced symmetry, electrospun responsive fibers and mats, flexoelectricity and piezoelectricity, small-scale rheometry, blue phases, and surface interactions of liquid crystals.

Works
S. M. Salili, M. G. Tamba, S. N. Sprunt, C. Welch, G. H. Mehl, A. Jákli, J. T. Gleeson, "Anomalous Increase in Nematic-Isotropic Transition Temperature in Dimer Molecules Induced by Magnetic Field", Physical Review Letters, 116 (21), 217801, 2016. .     
S. M. Salili, T. Ostapenko, O. Kress, C. Bailey, W. Weissflog, K. Harth, A. Eremin, R. Stannarius, A. Jákli, "Rupture and Recoil of Bent-Core Liquid Crystal Filaments", Soft Matter, 12 (21), 4725–4730, 2016. 
H. Shahsavan, S. M. Salili, A. Jákli, B. Zhao, "Smart Muscle-driven Self-cleaning of Biomimetic Microstructures from Liquid Crystal Elastomers", Advanced Materials, vol. 27 (43) p. 6828–6833, 2015. 
 
 
 
 
 A. Jákli, A. Saupe, One and Two Dimensional Fluids – Physical Properties of Smectic Lamellar and Columnar Liquid Crystals (2006)

Awards
 Alfred Saupe Prize (2020)
 Outstanding Research Scholar of Kent State University (2012) 
 Luckhurst-Samulski Prize 2010 (Taylor & Francis)
 Institute for Complex Adaptive Matter-ICAM Track II Postdoctoral Fellowship (2008, 2009)
 Library Research Collection Award, Kent State University (2007)
 Department of Education (2003)
 Bólyai Young Researchers Scholar (1998-1999), Hungarian Academy of Sciences
 Outstanding Research Associate, Kent State University (1992) 
 Young Scientist awards of the Central Research Institute of Physics, Hungary (1986, 1989)

References

1958 births
Kent State University faculty
Liquid crystals
20th-century Hungarian physicists
Hungarian emigrants to the United States
Living people
21st-century American physicists